Alfornia Jones (born February 10, 1959) is a former professional baseball relief pitcher. Jones played in MLB for the Chicago White Sox in parts of three seasons from 1983 to 1985.

Career
He played from 1983 through 1985 for the Chicago White Sox of Major League Baseball (MLB). His tenure with the White Sox ended when he and Tom Hartley were traded to the Milwaukee Brewers for Ray Searage. After the 1987 season, Jones became a free agent, and in 1990 signed with the Montreal Expos organization. Jones then went on to play from 1991 to 1994, and in 1998 and 1999 for the Brother Elephants of the Chinese Professional Baseball League.

References

External links
 or Retrosheet
Baseball Gauge
Mexican League
Venezuelan Professional Baseball League

1959 births
Living people
African-American baseball players
Alcorn State Braves baseball players
Alcorn State University alumni
Algodoneros de Unión Laguna players
American expatriate baseball players in Canada
American expatriate baseball players in Mexico
Appleton Foxes players
Baseball players from Mississippi
Buffalo Bisons (minor league) players
Cafeteros de Córdoba players
Chicago White Sox players
Denver Zephyrs players
Gulf Coast White Sox players
Jacksonville Expos players
Leones del Caracas players
American expatriate baseball players in Venezuela
Major League Baseball pitchers
Mexican League baseball pitchers
People from Charleston, Mississippi
Saraperos de Saltillo players
Vancouver Canadians players
21st-century African-American people
20th-century African-American sportspeople